The 2019–20 Merrimack Warriors men's basketball team represented Merrimack College during the 2019–20 NCAA Division I men's basketball season. The Warriors were led by fourth-year head coach Joe Gallo, and played their home games at Hammel Court in North Andover, Massachusetts as first-year members of the Northeast Conference (NEC).

The season marked the school's first season in NCAA Division I. The Warriors previously participated in Division II's Northeast-10 Conference (NE10). As part of their transition to Division I, the Warriors were not eligible for postseason play, including the NEC tournament, until 2024.

On February 27, 2020, Merrimack defeated Central Connecticut 69–58 to clinch at least a share of the Northeast Conference regular-season title. The Warriors became the first men's basketball team to record a 20-win season in its first Division I season. Due to NCAA rules for schools transitioning to D-I, the Warriors were ineligible to play in NCAA-sponsored postseason events (the NCAA Tournament and the NIT), and under NEC rules were ineligible for the conference tournament. Two days later, Robert Morris' 78–68 win over Saint Francis (PA) gave the Warriors the outright regular-season NEC title, making them the first men's basketball program to win an outright conference title in its first D-I season. Contrary to an Associated Press report, the Warriors were eligible for non-NCAA postseason events. They were a candidate for an invitation to the 2020 CollegeInsider.com Postseason Tournament. However, the CIT, and all postseason tournaments, were cancelled amid the COVID-19 pandemic.

Previous season 
The Warriors finished the 2018–19 season 22–10, 14–7 to finish in second place in the Northeast Division of NE10 play. They won the NE10 Tournament championship to earn the conference's automatic bid to the NCAA Division II tournament.

Roster

       

  

  

  

Source

Schedule and results

|-
!colspan=9 style=|Exhibition

|-
!colspan=9 style=|Non-conference regular season

|-
!colspan=9 style=| Northeast Conference regular season    

|-

Source

References

Merrimack Warriors men's basketball seasons
Merrimack
Merrimack
Merrimack